Nardana Pureeswarar Temple (நர்த்தனபுரீஸ்வரர் கோயில்) is a Hindu temple located at Thalayalangadu in the Tiruvarur district of Tamil Nadu, India. The temple is dedicated to Shiva.

History 

The Pandya king Nedunchezhiyan is believed to have defeated the Chera and Chola kings at this place.

Significance 

Prayer to the deity at the Nardana Pureeswarar Temple is believed to cure leprosy patients. Praises of the temple have been sung by Thirunavukkarasar.

Shrines 

There are shrines to Vinayaka, Viswanatha, Murugan and Bhairava within the temple complex.

References

External links 

 

Shiva temples in Tiruvarur district
Padal Petra Stalam